The 81st Brigade was a formation of  the British Army. It was originally formed from regular army battalions serving away from home in the British Empire. It was assigned to the 27th Division and served on the Western Front and the Macedonian Front during the First World War.

Formation
The infantry battalions did not all serve at once, but all were assigned to the brigade during the war.
1st Battalion, Royal Scots 	 
2nd Battalion, Gloucestershire Regiment
2nd Battalion, Queen's Own Cameron Highlanders 	 
1st Battalion, Argyll & Sutherland Highlanders 	 
1/9th Battalion, Royal Scots 
1/9th Battalion, Argyll & Sutherland Highlanders
13th Battalion, Black Watch 
81st Machine Gun Company
81st SAA Section Ammunition Column 
81st Trench Mortar Battery

References

Infantry brigades of the British Army in World War I